The Hoffman's Crossing Road Bridge is a Pratt thru truss bridge that carries Hoffman's Crossing Road across the South Branch Raritan River in the Hoffmans section of Lebanon Township in Hunterdon County, New Jersey. It was built in 1898 by Tippett and Wood of Phillipsburg. It was added to the New Jersey Register of Historic Places on February 11, 1999.

See also
List of crossings of the Raritan River

References

External links
 
 

Lebanon Township, New Jersey
Bridges in Hunterdon County, New Jersey
Bridges completed in 1898
1898 establishments in New Jersey
Road bridges in New Jersey
Pratt truss bridges in the United States
Bridges over the Raritan River
New Jersey Register of Historic Places